Alban William Housego "A. W." "Bill" Phillips, MBE (18 November 1914 – 4 March 1975) was a New Zealand economist who spent most of his academic career as a professor of economics at the London School of Economics (LSE). His best-known contribution to economics is the Phillips curve, which he first described in 1958. He also designed and built the MONIAC hydraulic economics computer in 1949.

Early life
Phillips was born at Te Rehunga near Dannevirke, New Zealand, to Harold Housego Phillips, a dairy farmer, and his wife, Edith Webber, a schoolteacher and postmistress.

He left New Zealand before finishing school to work in Australia at a variety of jobs, including crocodile hunter and cinema manager. In 1937 Phillips headed to China, but had to escape to Russia when Japan invaded China. He travelled across Russia on the Trans-Siberian Railway and made his way to United Kingdom in 1938, where he studied electrical engineering. At the outbreak of World War II, Phillips joined the Royal Air Force and was sent to Singapore. When Singapore fell, he escaped on the troopship Empire State, which came under attack before safely arriving in Java.

When Java, too, was overrun Phillips was captured by the Japanese, and spent three and a half years interned in a prisoner of war camp in the then Dutch East Indies (now Indonesia). During this period he learned Chinese from other prisoners, repaired and miniaturised a secret radio, and fashioned a secret water boiler for tea which he hooked into the camp lighting system. In 1946, he was made a Member of the Order of the British Empire (MBE) for his war service.

After the war he moved to London and began studying sociology at the London School of Economics, because of his fascination with prisoners of war's ability to organize themselves. But he became bored with sociology and developed an interest in Keynesian theory, so he switched his course to economics and within eleven years was a professor of economics.

Economics career

While a student at the LSE Phillips used his training as an engineer to develop MONIAC, an analogue computer which used hydraulics to model the workings of the British economy, inspiring the term hydraulic macroeconomics. It was very well received and Phillips was soon offered a teaching position at the LSE. He advanced from assistant lecturer in 1951 to professor in 1958.

His work focused on British data and observed that in years when the unemployment rate was high, wages tended to be stable, or possibly fall. Conversely, when unemployment was low, wages rose rapidly. This sort of pattern had been noticed earlier by Irving Fisher, but in 1958 Phillips published his own work on the relationship between inflation and unemployment, illustrated by the Phillips curve. Soon after the publication of Phillips' paper, the idea that there was a trade-off between a strong economy and low inflation caught the imagination of academic economists and policy-makers alike. Paul Samuelson and Robert Solow wrote an influential article describing the possibilities suggested by the Phillips curve in the context of the United States. What people think of as the Phillips curve has changed substantially over time, but remains an important feature of macroeconomic analysis of economic fluctuations. Had he lived longer, Phillips' contributions might have been worthy of a Nobel Prize in economics. He made several other notable contributions to economics, particularly relating to stabilization policy.

He returned to Australia in 1967 for a position at Australian National University which allowed him to devote half his time to Chinese studies. In 1969 the effects of his war deprivations and smoking caught up with him. He had a stroke, prompting an early retirement and return to Auckland, New Zealand, where he taught at the University of Auckland. He died in Auckland on 4 March 1975.

References

 Mike Hally, Electronic Brains: Stories from the Dawn of the Computer Age, Joseph Henry Press, 2005, 
 David Laidler, "Phillips in Retrospect". (A review essay on A. W. H. Phillips: Collected Works in Contemporary Perspective, edited by Robert Leeson, Cambridge, U.K., Cambridge University Press, 2000.)

External links
 Catalogue of the Phillips papers at the Archives Division of the London School of Economics
 
 BBC Radio 4 programme about Bill Phillips, first broadcast February 2013

1914 births
1975 deaths
New Zealand emigrants to the United Kingdom
Academics of the London School of Economics
New Zealand people of World War II
World War II prisoners of war held by Japan
People from Dannevirke
Royal Air Force personnel of World War II
Neo-Keynesian economists
20th-century British  economists
Fellows of the Econometric Society